Mahmoud Shukair (born 1941) is a Palestinian writer. He was born in Jabal al-Mukabbar in Jerusalem and studied philosophy and sociology at Damascus University. He was jailed twice by the Israeli authorities, and was deported to Lebanon in 1975. After living for 18 years in Beirut, Amman and Prague, he returned to Jerusalem in 1993. He worked for many years in teaching and journalism, and served as editor-in-chief of the cultural magazines Al-Talia'a (The Vanguard) and Dafatir Thaqafiya (Cultural File). He also occupied senior positions in the Jordanian Writers' Union, the Union of Palestinian Writers and Journalists, and the Palestinian Ministry of Culture.

Shukair is one of the best-known short story writers in the Arab world, and his stories have been translated into numerous languages. His 45 books include nine short story collections and 13 books for children. He has also written extensively for television, theatre, and print and online media. In 2011, he was awarded the Mahmoud Darwish Prize for Freedom of Expression. His 2016 novel Praise for the Women of the Family was nominated for the Arabic Booker Prize.

References

Living people
Palestinian writers
1941 births